Hove is a municipality (gemeente) located in the Belgian province of Antwerp. The municipality only comprises the town of Hove proper. In 2021, Hove had a total population of 8,287. The total area is 5.99 km2.

It is a small community, and is said to be one of the most expensive areas in Belgium. Many people pay large sums of money to live there because it is one of the safest places in Belgium. As a consequence Hove ranks 5th on the list of Belgian municipalities by average annual income per capita in 2019.

Notable residents
 Hugo Matthysen
 Bart Peeters
 Jan Leyers - singer-songwriter/philosopher/TV-producer/celebrity

References

Bibliography 
 Van Den Weygaert, Luc. "Hove in de wereld" (Hove in the world), Edit. Ouderits, Hove (Antwerp), 2010, 26 p.
 Van Den Weygaert, Luc. "Hove, culturele en toeristische verkenningen", Edit. Ouderits, Hove (Antwerp), 2012, 24 p.
 Van Gysel, Albert. "Bijdrage tot de geschiedenis van Hove" (The History of Hove), Edit. Jos Verheyen, Boechout (Antwerp), 1957, 80 p.

External links

  Hove official website

Municipalities of Antwerp Province
Populated places in Antwerp Province